Laura Sánchez López (born 29 May 1981) is a Spanish model and television actress.

Modeling
Sánchez began her modeling career in Huelva, and broke through when Victorio & Lucchino, fashion designers in Seville, hired her as a clothes model, although she fell down during their Spring/Summer 2001 fashion show (held in Madrid on 6 September 2000).

Agencies:
General Services Doble Erre
Next Model Management - Paris
Time Models
SS & M Model Management
Models Stockholmsgruppen
Why Not Model Agency
Next Company
Yuli Models

Television work
Los hombres de Paco (Paco's Men), 2008-2010 - a police procedural comedy on Antena 3. Sánchez portrayed Pepa Miranda, a lesbian police officer who falls in love with and marries her squad's forensic pathologist, Silvia Castro (portrayed by Marián Aguilera). She is heartbroken by the death of her wife and she seeks revenge to arrest the murderer.
La Fuga (The Escape), 2012 - a science fiction serial on Telecinco.

Personal life
Born in Groß-Gerau, West Germany, her family relocated to Huelva when she was two months old. Sánchez had a relationship with footballer Aitor Ocio, with whom she had a daughter, Naia, born on 1 August 2006, until the couple split in March 2009.

References

External links
Laura Sánchez at the Fashion Model Directory

Spanish female models
Spanish film actresses
1981 births
Living people
Spanish television actresses
21st-century Spanish actresses